The Battle River is a  tributary of Red Lake in Minnesota, the United States. It is formed by the junction of its North and South branches. The North Branch flows east to west for  entirely in Beltrami County, and the South Branch flows , starting at the outlet of Bartlett Lake in Koochiching County and flowing west-northwest into Beltrami County.

The name of Battle River commemorates a battle between the Ojibways and the Sioux.

See also
List of rivers of Minnesota

References

Minnesota Watersheds
USGS Hydrologic Unit Map - State of Minnesota (1974)

Rivers of Minnesota
Rivers of Beltrami County, Minnesota
Rivers of Koochiching County, Minnesota